Gare de Dreux is a railway station serving the town Dreux, Eure-et-Loir department, northwestern France.

Services
The station is served by regional trains to Argentan, Paris and Granville.

References

External links
 

Railway stations in Eure-et-Loir
Railway stations in France opened in 1864